The Melbourne University Lacrosse Club (MULC) was founded in 1883 and is the oldest extant lacrosse club in Australia and oldest continually existing lacrosse club in the world.

Premierships 
Melbourne University won their first men's A Grade premiership three years after formation in 1886 and won eight more until their last A Grade premiership in 1920.

A Grade Premierships:
 1886, 1887, 1889, 1895, 1897, 1899, 1900, 1915, 1920

See also 
 Lacrosse in Australia
 List of Victorian Lacrosse Premiers
 Adelaide University Lacrosse Club
 List of the oldest lacrosse teams

References

External links
 

Lacrosse teams in Australia
1883 establishments in Australia
Lacrosse clubs established in 1883
Lacrosse
Sporting clubs in Melbourne
University and college sports clubs in Australia